John Abrahams (born 21 July 1952) is an English retired cricket player. His brothers Basil and Peter Abrahams, and his late father Cec Abrahams, were also cricketers. During his playing career, Abrahams was known as a left-handed batsman and right arm off break bowler.

He was educated at Heywood Grammar School. He played for Lancashire County Cricket Club from 1973 to 1988, and also appeared for the Minor Counties in 1974 and Shropshire from 1989 to 1991. He was awarded his Lancashire cap in 1982, and captained Lancashire in 1984 and 1985. He won the man of the match award in the Benson and Hedges Cup final at Lord's in 1984 for his captaincy, despite not bowling and scoring a duck.  He was awarded a benefit season in 1988, which raised £52,500.

He scored 14 first-class hundreds, with a best of 201 not out against Warwickshire. His solitary one day century, 103*, came against Somerset.

Abrahams managed the England Under-19 team during 2009 and coached the side in 2010.  His wife Debbie is a Labour MP, elected at the January 2011 parliamentary by-election in Oldham East and Saddleworth.

References

1952 births
Living people
Lancashire cricket captains
Lancashire cricketers
People educated at Heywood Grammar School
Shropshire cricketers
Minor Counties cricketers
English cricketers